Roelof Petrus Hugo (born 1 July 1983) is a South African retired cricketer who played first-class and List A cricket for Mpumalanga and South Western Districts between 2006 and 2011.

Hugo was the captain and wicket-keeper for Mpumalanga when they played their inaugural season of first-class cricket in the 2006–07 season. He then spent four seasons as the wicket-keeper for South Western Districts. His highest first-class score was 91, which he made out of a team total of 165 all out for Mpumalanga against Namibia in November 2006. The next day he made a List A century against Namibia: 106 not out off 90 balls.

During the English cricket season, Hugo played as a professional for Heyside in the Saddleworth and District Cricket League in Lancashire from 2007 to 2011. He now works as the marketing and sales director for Nextrend, a health and safety company in Mpumalanga.

References

External links
 

1983 births
Living people
South African cricketers
South Western Districts cricketers
Mpumalanga cricketers
Cricketers from Johannesburg